WJZU is a Black Gospel formatted broadcast radio station licensed to Franklin, Virginia, serving Franklin, Eastern Southampton County, Virginia and Southern Isle of Wight County, Virginia.  WJZU is owned and operated by Franklin Broadcasting Corporation.

Previous logo

References

External links
Praise 99.1 & 1250 Facebook

JZU
JZU
Gospel radio stations in the United States
Radio stations established in 1956
1956 establishments in Virginia
JZU